Srirang Narvekar is the former president of the United Goans Democratic Party, a political party recognised in the Indian state of Goa.  He resigned the position in 2007.

References

Living people
Year of birth missing (living people)
Place of birth missing (living people)
United Goans Democratic Party politicians
21st-century Indian politicians